L4 or L-4 may refer to :

Transportation
 SP&S Class L-4, an 1884 steam locomotives class
 USS L-4 (SS-43), a 1915 United States Navy L-class submarine
 HMS L4, a 1918 British L class submarine
 Lawson L-4, a 1924 American unflown biplane airliner
 Piper Cub (U.S. military designation: L-4), an aircraft
 Inline-four engine (L4), a type of inline internal combustion four cylinder engine
 Liberty L-4, a World War I four-cylinder, water-cooled, inline, aero-engine 
 Lynx Aviation (IATA code)
 L4 (New York City bus), a temporary bus route in New York City
 Chaika L-4, a Russian twin-engined amphibious aircraft
 Soviet submarine L-4

Science and technology
 L4 microkernel family, a family of operating system kernels
L4, the transport layer in the OSI model of computer communications
 L4, the fourth Lagrangian point in an astronomical orbital configuration
 L4, an Lp space for p=4 (sometimes called Lebesgue spaces)
 L-4, the fourth iteration of L-carrier, high capacity frequency division multiplex over coaxial cable used by the Bell System

Biology
 Haplogroup L4 (mtDNA), a human mitochondrial DNA haplogroup
 Ribosomal protein L4, a human gene
 L4, a lumbar vertebra of the vertebral column, in human anatomy
 The fourth and last larval stage in the Caenorhabditis elegans worm development

Other uses
 L4, a modern version of the Bren light machine gun in the British Army
 ISO/IEC 8859-4 (Latin-4), an 8-bit character encoding

See also
 L04 (disambiguation)
 Level 4 (disambiguation)
 4L (disambiguation)